The Dreadful Hollow is a 1953 detective novel by Cecil Day-Lewis, written under the pen name of Nicholas Blake. It is the tenth in a series of novels featuring the private detective Nigel Strangeways.

Synopsis
After a series of poison pen letters in the Dorset village of Prior’s Umborne has led to a man taking his own life, Strangeways is called in by a wealthy local man to try and discover who is sending them. Before long, however, he has to deal with a second victim.

References

Bibliography
 Reilly, John M. Twentieth Century Crime & Mystery Writers. Springer, 2015.
 Stanford, Peter. C Day-Lewis: A Life. A&C Black, 2007.

1953 British novels
Novels by Cecil Day-Lewis
British crime novels
Collins Crime Club books
Novels set in Dorset
British detective novels